Frederick Grinnell (born 1945 in Philadelphia, Pennsylvania) is an American cell biologist, also known for his work in  bioethics and science education. Currently, he is a Distinguished Teaching Professor and the Robert McLemore Professor of Medical Science in the department of cell biology at UT Southwestern Medical Center in Dallas, Texas. Grinnell took his undergraduate degree in chemistry at Clark University (1966) and Ph.D. in biochemistry at Tufts New England Medical Center (1970). Subsequently, he moved to Dallas for postdoctoral work in the UTSW Biochemistry Department. In 1972, he joined the UTSW faculty in the Department of Cell Biology where he has developed a multidisciplinary research and teaching program, on one hand doing scientific research and on the other explaining what doing research entails. For additional information see the Grinnell laboratory website.

Awards
 2010 -- Grinnell's 2009 book Everyday Practice of Science: Where Intuition and Passion Meeting Objectivity and Logic shortlisted for the  Royal Society Prizes for Science Books 
 2012 -- Receives University of Texas System Regents' Outstanding Teaching Award
 2012 -- Elected Fellow of the American Association for the Advancement of Science, Section on History and Philosophy of Science
 2017 -- Receives Texas Statewide Piper Professor Award, Minnie Stevens Piper Foundation

References

External links
Grinnell Website

1945 births
Living people
Scientists from Philadelphia
Bioethicists
Jewish American scientists
American philosophers
Philosophers of science
Clark University alumni
Tufts University School of Medicine alumni
University of Texas Southwestern Medical Center faculty
Fellows of the American Association for the Advancement of Science
21st-century American Jews